Complaint or complaints may refer to:

Expressions of displeasure or concern
Complaint, a type of legal document
Complaining, the act of expressing general annoyance or unhappiness
Chief complaint or presenting problem, in medicine
Consumer complaint, a complaint addressed to a company or service provider
Airline complaints
Super-complaint, made in the UK by a state-approved watchdog organisation
 Complaint system, a set of procedures used in organizations to address complaints and resolve disputes

In arts and entertainment
 Lament bass, also known as complaint, a free musical form
 Complaints (poetry collection), by Edmund Spenser, published in 1591
 The Complaints, a novel by Scottish crime writer Ian Rankin

See also

 
 
 Criticism, the general practice of judging the merits and faults of something
 Critique, a method of systematic study of a discourse